Peter Alexander Greaney (born 1975) is a former University Boat Race cox.

Profile
Whilst in education at Abingdon School he gained colours for the Abingdon School Boat Club and became a Great Britain Junior International in 1993. After leaving Abingdon in 1994 he attended St Edmund Hall, Oxford at the University of Oxford studying Metallurgy and joined the St Edmund Hall Boat Club. He is currently Assistant Professor of Materials Science at the Department of Mechanical, Industrial & Manufacturing Engineering at
Oregon State University.

Rowing
In 1997 he was selected as the cox for the Oxford dark blue boat at the world renowned Boat Race but finished on the losing side. A second appearance as cox in 1998 ensued but Oxford once again lost.

See also
 List of Old Abingdonians

References

1975 births
Living people
People educated at Abingdon School
British male rowers
English male rowers